Felice is a name that can be used as both a given name, masculine or feminine, and a surname. It is a common name in Italian, where it is equivalent to Felix. Notable people with the name include:

Given name

Arts and literature

Film and theater
Felice Andreasi (1928–2005), an Italian actor
Felice Farina (born 1954), an Italian film director
Felice Jankell, a Swedish actress
Felice Minotti (1887–1963), an Italian actor
Felice Orlandi (1925–2003), an Italian-American actor
Felice Schachter (born 1963), an American actress

Music
Felice Alessandri (1747–1798), an Italian musician
Felice Anerio (c. 1560–1614), an Italian composer
Felice Blangini (1781–1841), an Italian composer
Felice Bryant (1925–2003), an American musician
Felice Chiusano (1922–1990), an Italian singer
Felice DeMatteo (1866–1929), an Italian-American composer
Felice Giardini (1716–1796), an Italian musician
Felice Lattuada (1882–1962), an Italian composer
Felice Romani (1788–1865), an Italian librettist, poet, and scholar
Felice Rosser, an American actor and musician
Felice Taylor (born 1948), an American singer
Felice Varesi (1813–1889), a French-Italian singer

Visual art
Felice Abrami (1872–1919), an Italian painter
Felice Beato (1932–1909), an Italian-British photographer
Felice Boscaratti (1721–1807), an Italian painter
Felice Boselli (1650–1732), an Italian painter
Felice Cappelletti (1656–1738), an Italian painter
Felice Carena (1879–1966), an Italian painter
Felice Casorati (1883–1963), an Italian painter
Felice Cerruti Bauduc (1818–1896), an Italian painter
Felice Cervetti (1718–1779), an Italian painter
Felice Cignani (1660–1724), an Italian painter
Felice Damiani (1530–1608), an Italian painter
Felice Feliciano (1433–1479), an Italian calligrapher
Felice Ficherelli (1605–1660), an Italian painter
Felice Giani (1758–1823), an Italian painter
Felice Ludovisi (1917–2012), an Italian painter
Felice Pazner Malkin (born 1929), an Israeli artist
Felice Polanzani (c. 1700–after 1771), an Italian engraver
Felice Quinto (1929–2010), an Italian photographer
Felice Riccio (1542–1605), an Italian painter
Felice Rix-Ueno (1893–1967), an Austrian textile artist
Felice Schiavoni (1803–1881), an Italian painter
Felice Scotto (active early 15th century), an Italian painter
Felice Torelli (1667–1748), an Italian painter
Felice Varini (born 1952), a Swiss artist
Felice Giuseppe Vertua (1820–1862), an Italian painter
Felice Vinelli (c. 1774–1825), an Italian painter

Other
Felice Arena, an Australian children's author and illustrator
Leo Buscaglia (1924–1998), an American author and motivational speaker, born Felice Buscaglia
Felice Cavallotti (1842–1898), an Italian politician and author 
Dré Steemans (1954–2009), a Belgian radio and TV host, who used the stage name Felice Damiano
Felice delle Piane (born 1940), an Italian art historian
Felice Noordhoff (born 2000), Dutch fashion model

Military and politics
Felice Pasquale Baciocchi (1762–1841), a Corsican nobleman and military officer
Felice Napoleone Canevaro (1838–1926), an Italian admiral and politician
Felice Casson (born 1953), an Italian politician
Felice Cavallotti (1842–1898), an Italian politician and author 
Felice Chilanti (1914–1982), an Italian journalist and resistance member 
Felice Cornicola, an 8th-century Venetian statesman
Felice D. Gaer (born 1946), an American human rights activist
Felice Guarneri (1882–1955), Italian economist and politician
Felice Orsini (1819–1858), an Italian revolutionary
Felice Platone (1896–1962), an Italian lawyer, politician, and resistance member
Felice Schragenheim (1922–1944), a German Jewish resistance fighter

Religion
Felice Cavagnis (1841–1906), an Italian canon lawyer and cardinal
Felice Figliucci (c. 1525–c. 1590), an Italian humanist, philosopher, and theologian
Felice Leonardo (1915–2015), an Italian bishop
Felice Antonio Monaco (1611–1667), an Italian cleric, Bishop of Martirano
Pope Sixtus V (1521–1590), born Felice Peretti di Montalto

Science and technology
Felice Bisleri (1851–1921), an Italian pharmacist
Felice Casorati (mathematician) (1835–1890), an Italian mathematician
Felice Fontana (1730–1805), an Italian physicist
Felice Frankel, an American science photographer
Felice Giordano (1825–1892), an Italian engineer and geologist
Felice Ippolito (1915–1997), an Italian engineer and geologist
Felice Lieh-Mak (born 1941), a Hong Kong psychiatrist
Felice Matteucci (1808–1887), an Italian hydraulic engineer

Sports

Association football
Felice Berardo (1888–1956), an Italian footballer
Felice Borel (1914–1993), an Italian footballer
Felice Cavaliere (born 1981), an Italian footballer
Felice Centofanti (born 1969), an Italian footballer
Félix Demaría (1912–date of death unknown), an Argentine footballer, also known as Felice
Felice Evacuo (born 1982), an Italian footballer
Felice Gasperi (1903–1982), an Italian footballer
Virgilio Levratto (1904–1968), an Italian footballer, sometimes referred to by his middle name, Felice
Felice Mancini (born 1965), an Italian footballer and coach
Felice Mariani (footballer) (born 1918), an Italian footballer
Felice Mazzu (born 1966), a Belgian football manager
Felice Natalino (born 1992), an Italian footballer
Felice Piccolo (born 1983), an Italian footballer
Felice Prevete (born 1987), an Italian footballer
Félix Romano (1894–1970), an Argentine footballer, also known as Felice, who played for the French and Italian national teams
Felice Soldini (1915–1971), Swiss footballer
Felice Vecchione (born 1991), an Italian-German footballer

Racing
Felice Benasedo (born 1922), an Italian motorcycle racer
Felice Bonetto (1903–1953), an Italian racing driver
Felice Nazzaro (1881–1940), an Italian racing driver
Felice Tedeschi (born 1962), an Italian racing driver

Other
Felice Chow (born 1977), a Trinidad and Tobago rower
Felice Darioli (born 1947), an Italian cross-country skier
Felice De Nicolo (born 1942), an Italian skier
Felice Fanetti (1914–1974), an Italian rower
Felice Gimondi (born 1942), an Italian cyclist
Felice Herrig (born 1984), an American martial artist
Felice Mariani (judoka) (born 1954), an Italian judoka
Felice Mueller (born 1989), an American rower
Felice Puttini (born 1967), a Swiss cyclist
Felice Rama, an Italian rugby union coach
Felice Soldini (born 1915), a Swiss footballer
Felice Torza (1920–1983), an American golfer

Writers
Felice Chilanti (1914–1982), an Italian journalist and resistance member 
Felice Newman, an American author and sex educator
Felice Picano (born 1944), an American writer
Felice Schwartz (1925–1996), an American feminist writer

Other
Felice Bauer (1887–1960), a Silesian woman who was engaged to Franz Kafka
Felice Mario Boano, an Italian automobile coachbuilder
Felice Colombo (born 1937), an Italian businessman
Felice Duffy, an American attorney and public speaker
Felice Lifshitz, an American historian
Felice della Rovere (c. 1483–1536), an illegitimate daughter of Pope Julius II
Felix Pedro (1858–1910), an Italian immigrant, born Felice Pedroni, who discovered gold in Alaska

Surname
Cynthia Felice (born 1942), an American science fiction author
Danny Felice, a Gibraltarian guitarist
Fortunato Felice (1723–1789), an Italian nobleman and polymath
Frank Felice (born 1961), an American composer
Giovanni Felice (1899–1977), a Maltese politician
Jacqueline Felice de Almania, a 14th-century Italian woman physician
Leonel Felice (born 1983), an Argentine footballer
Nicholas Felice (born 1927), an American politician
Simone Felice, a 17th-century Italian engraver
Anna Felice, Maltese judge
 Flice in Vietnam

See also
De Felice
Félicien
Felise